This is a List of Irish Republican separatists organizations assassinations. The list includes organizations as Official Irish Republican Army, Irish People's Liberation Organisation , Irish National Liberation Army, Provisional Irish Republican Army.

List

People killed during The Troubles (Northern Ireland)